Great Teacher Onizuka is a Japanese manga series written and illustrated by Tohru Fujisawa, serialized in Kodansha's Weekly Shōnen Magazine from January 8, 1997, to February 13, 2002. Its chapters were collected in twenty-five tankōbon volumes by Kodansha and released under the "Shōnen Magazine Comics" imprint from May 16, 1997, to April 17, 2002. Kodansha republished the series in twelve bunkoban volumes from September 12, 2017, to February 14, 2018.

In North America, the manga was licensed for English release by Tokyopop in 2001. The twenty five volumes were released from April 23, 2002, to August 9, 2005. Kodansha USA republished the series digitally on February 2, 2022.



Volume list
Note: All chapters are labeled as "Lessons".

References

External links

chapters
Great Teacher Onizuka